Leptobrachella liui, also known as Fujian Asian toad or Fujian metacarpal-tubercled toad, is a frog species in the family Megophryidae. Originally described from Chong'an in Fujian (present Wuyishan City), it is now known to be widely distributed in southern and southeastern China from Zhejiang and Fujian west to Guizhou and Guangxi.

Description
The toes have wide fringes and some webbing. The dorsum is grey brown with spots, with indistinct spots on the sides. The venter is immaculate. The iris is brownish.

Habitat and conservation
Breeding takes place in streams. It is not considered threatened by the IUCN, although it can locally suffer from habitat destruction and degradation.

References

liui
Frogs of China
Fauna of Hong Kong
Endemic fauna of China
Amphibians described in 1990
Taxonomy articles created by Polbot